Anyway Gang is a Canadian supergroup, consisting of Sam Roberts, Chris Murphy (from Sloan), Menno Versteeg (from Hollerado), and Dave Monks (from Tokyo Police Club). The group formed in the summer of 2018 and released their debut single, "Big Night" in September, 2019. Their debut album, Anyway Gang, was released on November 29, 2019, on Royal Mountain Records.

Discography

Studio albums

Singles

References 

Rock music supergroups
Musical groups established in 2018
Canadian alternative rock groups
2018 establishments in Canada